Pseudomonacanthus macrurus (strap-weed filefish), is a filefish of the family Monacanthidae.  It reaches a maximum length of 18 cm.

Strap-weed filefish are often found in pairs and inhabit shallow coastal algal reefs and estuaries across the Indian and Pacific oceans.

References

External links
 

Monacanthidae
Taxa named by Pieter Bleeker
Fish described in 1857